Chariesthes bella is a species of longhorn beetles of the subfamily Lamiinae. It is found in numerous regions throughout Africa, ranging from Sierra Leone and the Ivory Coast to the forests of Uganda.

References

External links
 Chariesthes bella at insectoid.info

Chariesthes
Beetles described in 1817